Daniel Robitaille, colloquially known as Candyman, is a fictional character and the main antagonist of the Candyman film series. The character originated in Clive Barker's 1985 short story, "The Forbidden". In the film series, he is depicted as an African-American man who was brutally murdered for a forbidden 19th-century interracial love affair; he returns as an urban legend, and kills anyone who summons him by saying his name five times in front of a mirror. The character is played by Tony Todd in Candyman (1992), Candyman: Farewell to the Flesh (1995), and Candyman: Day of the Dead (1999); Todd reprises the role in Candyman (2021), a sequel of the original 1992 film, with additional formssouls brought into the Candyman "hive"Sherman Fields (played by Michael Hargrove), William Bell, Samuel Evans, George Stinney, James Byrd Jr., Gil Cartwright (played by Cedric Mays), and Anthony McCoy (played by Yahya Abdul-Mateen II).

Appearances

Literature
The character originated in Clive Barker's short story, "The Forbidden", published in volume five of Barker's six-volume Books of Blood anthology collection. Fantasy Tales artist John Stewart's own image in the book's illustration deviates from the author's words – giving us a beastly man in silhouette with wild hair and a far more elaborate hook hand than was shown in the later films; but in the pages, Candyman is described thus:
 
He was bright to the point of gaudiness: His flesh was a waxy yellow. His thin lips are pale blue. His wild eyes are glittering as if their irises are set with rubies. His jacket was patchwork and his trousers are the same. He looked, [Helen] thought, almost ridiculous with his bloodstained motley and the hint of rouge on his jaundiced cheeks.

The Candyman's iconic hook and bees are introduced in the story with Helen and other characters. Although Candyman was described as a mysterious Caucasian male having long blonde hair with an unruly red beard, incredibly pale skin that is yellow, and a brightly multi-colored patchwork suit; his race, name, place of origin, and backstory are never mentioned; doubting his existence is enough to summon him.

Films
Candyman's first film appearance was in Candyman (1992). Set in the present, the film follows Helen Lyle, a graduate student in Chicago, who investigates him as the central figure of an urban legend connected to a series of murders at the Cabrini–Green Homes.

Helen writes a thesis about how Cabrini–Green's residents attribute their hardships to this apparently-mythical figure. When she discredits the legend, analyzing examples of his history and participating in the arrest of a criminal using the Candyman legend to intimidate the locals, Candyman appears and frames her for another series of murders to perpetuate the public's fear of him.

It is hinted that Helen is the reincarnation of Candyman's lover. He plots to have himself, Helen, and kidnapped baby Anthony McCoy immolated in a bonfire, but Helen escapes him and sacrifices herself to rescue Anthony. With Candyman apparently destroyed, Helen becomes a vengeful spirit and continues his behavior.

In Candyman: Farewell to the Flesh, set three years after Candyman in 1995, he appears in New Orleans. Candyman encounters Annie Tarrant (a descendant of his and Caroline's daughter Isabel) after she summons him. The movie explores how he meets Caroline Sullivan during his lifetime (as the artist Daniel Robitaille) before he is murdered and becomes Candyman.

In Candyman: Day of the Dead, set twenty-five years after Farewell to the Flesh, in 2020, Candyman appears in Los Angeles during Day of the Dead celebrations, encountering Annie's adult daughter Caroline.

In Candyman (2021), set  twenty-seven years after Candyman (1992), in 2019, Candyman is summoned once more by a now adult Anthony McCoy. It is revealed that the legend of Candyman has survived and evolved by being recontextualized throughout the years around similar tragic murders of African-Americans killed by racist authorities in ways that resemble his (Daniel Robitaille's) death, and that these figures become part of "the hive" of Candyman. The Candyman before Anthony was a mentally disabled man named Sherman Fields, who was accused of placing razor blades in children's candy before being beaten to death by the police for it, although he turned out to be innocent. Eventually, a disfigured and catatonic Anthony is gunned down by the police, thereby enabling Candyman to assimilate Anthony and renew his legend. Other characters depicted as part of the Candyman hive include Anthony Crawford, William Bell, Samuel Evans, George Stinney, Helen Lyle, James Byrd, Jr., and Gil Cartwright (in deleted scenes).

Development

Concept and creation

When Tony Todd and co-star Virginia Madsen were cast as Candyman and Helen, original Candyman director Bernard Rose gave them free rein to flesh out their characters' backstories as part of the creative process. Rose said, "The Candyman is not black in Clive's story. In fact, the whole back story of the interracial love affair that went wrong is not in the book. Everything that's in the book is in the film, but it's been amplified." Todd came up with the character's backstory during rehearsals with Madsen. He called his character "Granville T. Candyman", who has a forbidden love affair with a white woman whose portrait he paints (leading to his lynching). The name "Granville" is never used, and the character's name ultimately becomes Daniel Robitaille.

Characterization
The Candyman is largely driven by a need to sustain his legacy, killing those who doubt his existence. He has been described as a "ghoul fueled by the 'faith' of his believers. He is forced to deal with his followers to make them believe again and punish the interloper who leads them astray." In Draculas, Vampires and Other Undead Forms: Essays on Gender, Race and Culture, the character is compared to a vampire: "[Candyman] possesses the capacity to hypnotize his prey such that they appear to desire their victimizations."

Tony Todd compared his ability to invoke fear, suggestion and seduction to the DC Comics villain Scarecrow. Todd also compared his character to the Phantom of the Opera and the Hunchback of Notre Dame; all are "monsters", who use tenderness and terror in an unsuccessful attempt to win the love of a female protagonist. Virginia Madsen confirmed that the Candyman was intended to be an "African-American Dracula", "appealing to the African-American community because they finally had their own Dracula".

In Day of the Dead, the lynch mob chants "Candyman" five times before he dies. Summoning a specter by chanting his name repeatedly in front of a mirror may be traced back to Bloody Mary. In the short story, the character describes his existence as an urban legend: "I am rumor. It's a blessed condition, believe me. To live in people's dreams; to be whispered at street-corners; but not have to be". According to the film version, "I am the writing on the wall, the whisper in the classroom. Without these things, I am nothing".

Supernatural abilities and appearance 
The Candyman physical appearance is often seen by the subject who summoned him and those who believe in him. His image is not able to be captured by individuals who don't believe as well as not seen physically to the naked eye through surveillance systems but may be seen through reflections to the affected subject. He often uses the ability to possess an individual by hypnosis placing them in a trance with his dark poetic voice, making attempts at mind control on his subjects to surrender to him and become immortal. As with the 2021 film, the spirit of Candyman through Sherman Fields doesn't speak but rather makes painful eerie breathing sounds. In the film series, he can make his murders seem as if his subjects committed them themselves as his existence is played on by their mind. Candyman in supernatural form has the ability to levitate into the air. In Candyman (1992), the Candyman is seen by Helen Lyle floating horizontally as well as swiftly flying out of a window backwards. As with both standalone sequels he is seen by Annie Tarrant in Farewell to the Flesh rising from water into the air, landing on top of water. In Day of the Dead, he appears to Caroline McKeever levitating towards her with bees surrounding him. In Candyman (2021), he appears both in standing form and floating levitation with bees following him, it is also in this film that he is able to be a vessel within his main subject in the reflection. In the film series, Candyman has the ability to swiftly disappear and instantly change positions around the subject. Daniel Robitaille's physical body appear to be rotting away with his chest cavity exposed (hidden by his Trench coat) with bees swarming in the flesh, as with Sherman Fields appearance is displayed by his rotten affected beaten face. Anthony McCoy becomes a Candyman with his entire body going through a fleshy transformation and accumulate a bee-hive like appearance throughout his skin.

Legacy

The Candyman was ninth on Fandango and Bloody Disgusting's list of top 10 slasher icons, and eighth on an older Bloody Disgusting list. Based on a readers' poll, Rolling Stone ranked him tenth among horror villains. JoBlo.com ranked the Candyman fifth on its list of horror boogeymen, and ComingSoon.net ranked him seventh on its list of slasher villains.

Candyman is sometimes referenced in songs, most notably Tupac Shakur song "Troublesome '96" with him urging listeners to "say my name three times like Candyman...Bet I roll on yo' ass like an avalanche", which often confused many people to this present day with debates if the summoning was three or five, however the actual times to summon is five. It was in fact Bloody Mary who is summoned three times. Kayne West also gave mention in his song titled " Breathe In, Breathe Out" rapping, "So, say my name like Candyman, and I'ma come and fix you up like the handyman".

The character was often parodied or mentioned in many television, movies and media ranging from The Simpsons, South Park, The Chappelle Show and Key & Peele. Social media also parodied Candyman various ways with mock trailers or appearances in their videos/short. A meme created with a picture of Terrance Howard circulated in the late 2010s with the spelling caption of Candyman as 'CANDY-MAYNE' (pronounced candy-mine) due to his southern vocal accent and speaking annunciation of how he pronounces the word "man". It was then followed by mock VHS/DVDs/Bluray with Howard as the Candyman with the accent spelling in the title, also followed by edited parodied video/bits that went viral of what would the movie be like if Terrance Howard starred in the movie, it featured the impersonation of Howards' voice and likeness saying CANDY-MAYNE in the mirror and others correcting him to pronounce the name right otherwise he wont come out.

Merchandise

McFarlane Toys released a Candyman action figure as part of its Movie Maniacs Series 4 in 2001. More action figures were scheduled for release in November 2019 by NECA.

Yayha Abdul-Mateen II version of the Anthony McCoy's Candyman was released from Funko Pop merchandising in 2022. It features him dressed in his painter's overall jumpsuit wearing the honey colored Trench coat with bees surrounding his honeycomb like face.

See also
 List of horror film villains

Explanatory notes

References

Male horror film villains
Slasher film antagonists
Black characters in films
Candyman (film series)
Clive Barker characters
Characters in short stories
Male literary villains
Fiction about interracial romance
Literary characters introduced in 1985
Fictional amputees
Fictional bees
Fictional illusionists
Fictional hypnotists and indoctrinators
Fictional kidnappers
Fictional murdered people
Fictional stalkers
Fictional painters
Fictional murderers
Fictional serial killers
Fictional mass murderers
Fictional monsters
Fictional ghosts
Fictional African-American people
Fictional characters with superhuman strength
Fictional characters who can teleport
Fictional characters from Chicago
Undead supervillains